is a Japanese retired kickboxer and mixed martial artist. A professional competitor between 2000 and 2016, Yoshimoto held the RISE super lightweight title and was the 2007 Pancrase Neo Blood Featherweight Tournament winner.

Kickboxing career

RISE

Super lightweight champion
Yoshimoto was scheduled to fight Yūsuke Sugawara for the inaugural RISE super lightweight title at RISE 60 on November 22, 2009. He won the fight by unanimous decision, after two extra rounds were contested.

After capturing the inaugural title, Yoshimoto faced Naoki in a non-title bout at RISE 63 on April 7, 2010. He lost the fight by split decision, after an extra round was fought. Yoshimoto next faced TURBΦ in another non-title bout at RISE 68 on July 31, 2010. He won the fight by a late second-round knockout, flooring his opponent with a right cross. Yoshimoto faced Yuto Watanabe in his third consecutive non-title bout at RISE 71 on October 3, 2010. He won the fight by majority decision.

Yoshimoto moved down in weight for his next bout, in order to face Yuki for the inaugural RISE lightweight title at RISE 73R on December 19, 2010. He was stopped with low kicks at the 2:09 minute mark of the second round.

Yoshimito faced Yūsuke Sugawara for the second time in his career in his first RISE super lightweight title defense at RISE 74 on February 27, 2011. The fight was ruled a unanimous decision draw.

After making his first title defense, Yoshimoto faced Shohei Asahara at K-1 WORLD MAX 2011 -63kg Japan Tournament FINAL	on June 25, 2011. He won the fight by unanimous decision, after an extra round was fought. Yoshimoto next faced Hiroshi Mizumachi in a non-title bout at RISE 83 on September 23, 2011. He won the fight by unanimous decision. Yoshimoto faced Lee Sung-hyun in another non-title bout at RISE 85 on November 23, 2011. He once again won by unanimous decision.

Yoshimoto faced Yasuomi Soda in his second RISE title defense at RISE 86 on January 28, 2012. He won the fight by unanimous decision. Yoshimoto next beat Raz Sarkisjan by unanimous decision in a non-title bout at RISE/M-1MC ～INFINITY～ on December 2, 2012, before being booked to rematch Yasuomi Soda in his third RISE title defense at RISE 92 on March 17, 2013. He lost the fight by unanimous decision.

Later RISE career
Yoshimoto faced Xie Lei at K-1 WORLD MAX 2013 Final on October 11, 2014. He lost the fight by unanimous decision. Yoshimoto rebounded from this loss with a decision win against Hanji at K-1 CHINA vs JAPAN on February 1, 2015. Yoshimoto extended his winning streak to two fights with a third-round knockout of Daniel Zahra at RISE 105 on May 31, 2015. This winning streak was snapped by Hiroki Shishido at SHOOT BOXING 30th ANNIVERSARY "CAESAR TIME!" on August 22, 2015, who beat him by a fifth-round technical knockout. Yoshimoto faced Zakaria Zouggary in his retirement fight at RISE 109 on January 31, 2016. He won the fight by a third-round technical knockout.

Titles and accomplishments

Kickboxing
 2005 IKMF Asia Lightweight Championship
RISE
 2009 RISE Super Lightweight ChampionshipAwardseFight.jpFighter of the Month (January 2016)
Mixed martial arts
 2007 Pancrase Neo Blood Featherweight Tournament Winner

Mixed martial arts record

| Win
| align=center| 5–1–2
| Fanjin Son
| Decision (Majority)
| Cage Force EX Eastern Bound
| 
| align=center| 3
| align=center| 5:00
| Tokyo, Japan
|
|-
| Draw
| align=center| 4–1–2
| Mitsuhisa Sunabe
| Draw (Majority)
| Pancrase: Rising 6
| 
| align=center| 3
| align=center| 5:00
| Tokyo, Japan
| 
|-
| Win
| align=center| 4-1-1
| Yuichi Miyagi
| Forfeit
| PANCRASE 2007 RISING TOUR
| 
| align=center| 
| align=center| 
| Tokyo, Japan
| Wins Neo Blood Featherweight Tournament
|-
| Win
| align=center| 3-1-1
| Takashi Hasegawa
| KO (Left Cross)
| PANCRASE 2007 RISING TOUR
| 
| align=center| 2
| align=center| 3:06
| Tokyo, Japan
| Neo Blood Featherweight Tournament Semi Final
|-
| Loss
| align=center| 2-1-1
| Takashi Hasegawa
| Disqualification (Low Blow)
| PANCRASE 2007 RISING TOUR
| 
| align=center| 2
| align=center| 3:20
| Tokyo, Japan
| Neo Blood Featherweight Tournament Semi Final
|-
| Win
| align=center| 2-0-1
| Yasutomo Tanaka
| Decision (Unanimous)
| PANCRASE 2007 RISING TOUR
| 
| align=center| 2
| align=center| 5:00
| Tokyo, Japan
| Neo Blood Featherweight Tournament Quarter Final
|-
| Win
| align=center| 1-0-1
| Yuki Yamasawa
| Decision (Majority)
| PANCRASE 2006 Special Night
| 
| align=center| 2
| align=center| 5:00
| Tokyo, Japan
|
|-
| Draw
| align=center| 0-0-1
| Yuichiro Shirai
| Decision
| PANCRASE 2006 BLOW TOUR
| 
| align=center| 2
| align=center| 5:00
| Tokyo, Japan
|

Kickboxing record

|-  bgcolor="#cfc"
| 2016-01-31|| Win ||align=left| Zakaria Zouggary || RISE 109 || Tokyo, Japan || TKO (Knee to the body) || 3 || 1:58
|-  bgcolor="#fbb"
| 2015-08-22 || Loss ||align=left| Hiroki Shishido || SHOOT BOXING 30th ANNIVERSARY“CAESAR TIME!” || Tokyo, Japan || Ext.R TKO  || 5 || 1:41
|-  bgcolor="#cfc"
| 2015-05-31|| Win ||align=left| Daniel Zahra || RISE 105 || Tokyo, Japan || KO (Right Knee) || 3 || 2:15
|-  bgcolor="#cfc"
| 2015-02-01|| Win ||align=left| Hanji || K-1 CHINA vs JAPAN || China || Decision || 3 || 3:00
|-  bgcolor="#fbb"
| 2014-10-11|| Loss ||align=left| Xie Lei || K-1 WORLD MAX 2013 Final || Pattaya, Thailand || Decision (Unanimous) || 3 || 3:00
|-  bgcolor="#fbb"
| 2014-06-07|| Loss ||align=left| Daniel Zahra || WKN GLADIATOR 8 || Malta || Decision  || 3 || 3:00
|-
! style=background:white colspan=9 |
|-  bgcolor="#cfc"
| 2014-03-30|| Win ||align=left| Ryu Hyun Woo || RISE 98 || Tokyo, Japan || Decision (Majority) || 3 || 3:00
|-  bgcolor="#fbb"
| 2013-03-17|| Loss|| align=left| Yasuomi Soda  ||RISE 92|| Tokyo, Japan ||  Decision (Unanimous) || 5 || 3:00
|-
! style=background:white colspan=9 |
|-  bgcolor="#cfc"
| 2012-12-02|| Win || align=left| Raz Sarkisjan  ||RISE/M-1MC ～INFINITY～|| Tokyo, Japan ||  Decision (Unanimous) || 3 || 3:00
|-  style="background:#cfc;"
| 2012-01-28|| Win|| align=left| Yasuomi Soda  || RISE 86 || Japan || Decision (Unanimous) || 5 || 3:00
|-
! style=background:white colspan=9 |
|-  style="background:#cfc;"
| 2011-11-23|| Win|| align=left| Lee Sung-hyun  || RISE 85 || Japan || Decision (Unanimous) || 3 || 3:00
|-  style="background:#cfc;"
| 2011-09-23|| Win|| align=left| Hiroshi Mizumachi  || RISE 83 || Japan || Decision (Unanimous) || 3 || 3:00
|-  style="background:#cfc;"
| 2011-06-25|| Win|| align=left| Shohei Asahara  || K-1 WORLD MAX 2011 -63kg Japan Tournament FINAL || Japan || Ext.R Decision (Unanimous) || 4 || 3:00
|-  bgcolor="#c5d2ea"
| 2011-02-27|| Draw|| align=left| Yūsuke Sugawara  ||RISE 74 || Tokyo, Japan ||  Decision (Unanimous) || 5 || 3:00
|-
! style=background:white colspan=9 |
|-  bgcolor="#fbb"
| 2010-12-19 || Loss ||align=left| Yuki || RISE 73R || Japan || TKO (Low Kicks) || 2 || 2:09
|-
! style=background:white colspan=9 |
|-  bgcolor="#cfc"
| 2010-10-03 || Win ||align=left| Yuto Watanabe || RISE 71 || Tokyo, Japan || Decision (Majority) || 3 || 3:00
|-  bgcolor="#cfc"
| 2010-07-31 || Win ||align=left| TURBΦ	 || RISE 68 || Tokyo, Japan || KO (Right Cross) || 2 || 2:54
|-  bgcolor="#fbb"
| 2010-04-07 || Loss ||align=left| Naoki || RISE 63 || Tokyo, Japan || Ext.R Decision (Split) || 4 || 3:00
|-  bgcolor="#cfc"
| 2009-11-22 || Win ||align=left| Yūsuke Sugawara || RISE 60 || Tokyo, Japan || 2nd Ext.R Decision (Unanimous) || 6 || 3:00
|-
! style=background:white colspan=9 |
|-  bgcolor="#cfc"
| 2009-10-14 || Win ||align=left| Shoji || RISE 59 || Tokyo, Japan || Decision (Unanimous) || 3 || 3:00
|-  bgcolor="#cfc"
| 2009-08-14 || Win ||align=left| Shunsuke Ōishi  || Krush Lightweight Grand Prix 2009 ～Round.2～ || Tokyo, Japan || Ext.R Decision (Uannimous) || 4 || 3:00
|-  bgcolor="#fbb"
| 2009-06-14 || Loss ||align=left| Yuki Yamamoto || MA Japan Kick BREAK THROUGH-11 || Tokyo, Japan || TKO || 4 || 0:23
|-  bgcolor="#fbb"
| 2008-12-23 || Loss ||align=left| Akihiro Kuroda|| KING OF KINGS TOUITSU, Semi Final || Kobe, Japan || Ext.R Decision (Split) || 4 || 3:00
|-  bgcolor="#cfc"
| 2008-12-23 || Win ||align=left| Rashata || KING OF KINGS TOUITSU, Quarter Final || Kobe, Japan || Ext.R Decision (Uannimous) || 4 || 3:00
|-  bgcolor="#cfc"
| 2008-09-19 || Win ||align=left| Kanongsuk Weerasakreck || AJKF SWORD FIGHT 2008 || Tokyo, Japan || Decision (Uannimous) || 5 || 3:00
|-  bgcolor="#cfc"
| 2008-05-31 || Win ||align=left| Ryuji Kajiwara || AJKF vs Team Dragon || Tokyo, Japan || Decision (Majority) || 3 || 3:00
|-  style="background:#cfc;"
| 2008-03-20|| Win ||align=left| Yoichiro Miakami || AJKF Kick　On ! || Tokyo, Japan || Decision (Majority) || 3 || 3:00
|-  style="background:#cfc;"
| 2006-10-07|| Win ||align=left| Tomohiro Shimano|| AJKF CUB☆KICK’S 3days 1st AJ NIGHT ～Tradition～|| Tokyo, Japan || Decision (Majority) || 3 || 3:00
|-  style="background:#fbb;"
| 2006-01-04|| Loss ||align=left| Satoruvashicoba || AJKF NEW YEAR KICK FESTIVAL 2006|| Tokyo, Japan || KO (Left Hook) || 2 || 2:30
|-
! style=background:white colspan=9 |
|-  style="background:#cfc;"
| 2005-11-12|| Win ||align=left| Hiromasa Masuda|| AJKF Fight Must Go On|| Tokyo, Japan || Decision (Unanimous) || 3 || 3:00
|-  style="background:#cfc;"
| 2005-09-24|| Win ||align=left| Chung Hyo Son|| IKMF in Korea|| South Korea || KO (Majority) || 4 || 1:47
|-
! style=background:white colspan=9 |
|-  style="background:#fbb;"
| 2005-06-24|| Loss ||align=left| Makoto Kimura || MA Japan Kick DETERMINATION || Tokyo, Japan || Decision (Unanimous)|| 3 || 3:00
|-  style="background:#cfc;"
| 2005-03-18|| Win ||align=left| Kim Pan Su|| SNKA RUSH !|| Tokyo, Japan || Decision (Majority) || 3 || 3:00
|-  style="background:#fbb;"
| 2004-11-19|| Loss ||align=left| Satoruvashicoba || AJKF The Championship, All Japan Lightweight Championship Tournament, Semi Final|| Tokyo, Japan || KO (Left Hook) || 2 || 0:31
|-  style="background:#fbb;"
| 2004-08-22|| Loss ||align=left| Mourad Tijarti|| AJKF SUPER FIGHT -LIGHTNING-|| Tokyo, Japan || TKO (Doctor Stoppage) || 1 || 1:44
|-  style="background:#fbb;"
| 2004-04-16|| Loss ||align=left| Tsogto Amara || AJKF All Japan Lightweight Tournament 2004 FINAL STAGE, Semi Final|| Tokyo, Japan || Decision (Unanimous) || 3 || 3:00
|-  style="background:#cfc;"
| 2004-04-16|| Win||align=left| Makoto Nishiyama || AJKF All Japan Lightweight Tournament 2004 2nd.STAGE|| Tokyo, Japan || Decision (Unanimous) || 3 || 3:00
|-  style="background:#cfc;"
| 2004-03-13|| Win||align=left| Kaito || AJKF All Japan Lightweight Tournament 2004 1st.STAGE|| Tokyo, Japan || Decision (Majority) || 3 || 3:00
|-  style="background:#fbb;"
| 2003-11-23|| Loss||align=left| Satoshi Kobayashi || AJKF "SCRAMBLE"|| Tokyo, Japan || Decision (Unanimous) || 3 || 3:00
|-  style="background:#cfc;"
| 2003-09-07|| Win||align=left| Takenobu Uesugi || AJKF "DEAD HEAT"|| Tokyo, Japan || Decision (Unanimous) || 3 || 3:00
|-  style="background:#cfc;"
| 2003-06-20|| Win||align=left| Hiroshi Seki || AJKF "DEAD HEAT"|| Tokyo, Japan || Decision (Unanimous) || 3 || 3:00
|-  style="background:#cfc;"
| 2002-05-30|| Win||align=left| Rascal Taka || AJKF vs J-NETWORK "MOVEMENT"|| Tokyo, Japan || Decision (Unanimous) || 3 || 3:00
|-  style="background:#c5d2ea;"
| 2002-01-20|| Draw||align=left| Kenshi Nakamura || J-NETWORK MAKING J-BLOODS || Tokyo, Japan || Decision  || 3 || 3:00
|-  style="background:#fbb;"
| 2001-07-17|| Loss ||align=left| Jun Inaba || J-NETWORK THE CRUSADE II || Tokyo, Japan || KO || 2 || 3:00
|-  style="background:#c5d2ea;"
| 2001-05-31|| Draw||align=left| Rittichai Payanan || J-NETWORK MAKING THE ROAD-3 || Tokyo, Japan || Decision  || 3 || 3:00
|-  style="background:#fbb;"
| 2001-03-23|| Loss ||align=left| Kenshi Nakamura || J-NETWORK THE CRUSADE || Tokyo, Japan || Decision (Majority) || 3 || 3:00
|-  style="background:#cfc;"
| 2000-12-25|| Win ||align=left| Ryo Takemura || J-NETWORK SHANGURILA-FIN|| Tokyo, Japan || Decision (Unanimous) || 3 || 3:00
|-  style="background:#fbb;"
| 2000-11-19|| Loss ||align=left| Izumi Yusaku || J-NETWORK || Tokyo, Japan || Decision (Unanimous) || 3 || 3:00
|-  style="background:#cfc;"
| 2000-10-17|| Win ||align=left| Ryusei Kasumoto || J-NETWORK SHANGURILA-3|| Tokyo, Japan || Decision (Unanimous) || 3 || 3:00
|-  style="background:#cfc;"
| 2000-07-31|| Win ||align=left| Hideki Uchida || J-NETWORK SHANGURILA-2|| Tokyo, Japan || Decision (Unanimous) || 3 || 3:00
|-
| colspan=9 | Legend''':

References

Living people
1980 births
Japanese male kickboxers
Japanese male mixed martial artists
Mixed martial artists utilizing kickboxing